Mateusz Piątkowski (born 22 November 1984) is a Polish professional footballer who plays as a striker for Górnik Polkowice.

Career
Piątkowski spent a major part of his early career playing for Polish second division teams such as GKP Gorzów Wielkopolski, KS Polkowice and Dolcan Ząbki.

Jagiellonia Białystok
He made his Ekstraklasa debut while playing for Jagiellonia Białystok in 2013–14 season, aged 28. He had an impressive second season with Jagiellonia, managing to score 14 goals in 24 appearances in the 2014–15 Ekstraklasa.

APOEL
On the 24 June 2015, aged 30, Piątkowski moved abroad for the first time in his career and signed a two-year contract with Cypriot club APOEL FC. He made his official debut on 14 July 2015, in APOEL's 0–0 home draw against FK Vardar for the second qualifying round of the UEFA Champions League. He scored his first official goal for APOEL on 26 October 2015 in his team's 9–0 away win over Nea Salamina for the Cypriot First Division. Although he was not a regular starter at APOEL's lineup and he scored only one goal, at the end of the season he was crowned champion for the first time in his career, as his team managed to win the Cypriot First Division title for a fourth time in the row. On 5 January 2017, his contract with APOEL was terminated.

Górnik Polkowice
On 5 October 2020, he signed with Górnik Polkowice.

Honours
APOEL
Cypriot First Division: 2015–16

Górnik Polkowice
II liga: 2020–21

References

External links
 APOEL official profile
 
 

1984 births
Living people
Polish footballers
Association football forwards
Ekstraklasa players
I liga players
II liga players
Cypriot First Division players
Polar Wrocław players
Stilon Gorzów Wielkopolski players
KS Polkowice players
Ząbkovia Ząbki players
Jagiellonia Białystok players
APOEL FC players
Wisła Płock players
Miedź Legnica players
GKS Tychy players
Górnik Polkowice players
Polish expatriate footballers
Expatriate footballers in Cyprus
Polish expatriate sportspeople in Cyprus
People from Bielawa
Sportspeople from Lower Silesian Voivodeship